Hermann von Vicari (13 May 1773 at Aulendorf in Württemberg – 14 April 1868 at Freiburg) was a German Catholic churchman, who became Archbishop of Freiburg, in Baden.

Life

In 1789 he received tonsure at Constance and obtained a canonry, studied law until 1795 at Vienna, and after a brief practice began the study of theology. In 1797 he was ordained priest, and made ecclesiastical councillor and official of the episcopal curia at Constance. After the suppression of the diocese (1802) the Archbishop of Freiburg appointed him cathedral canon, in 1827 vicar-general, and in 1830 cathedral dean.

In 1822 he was appointed Auxiliary Bishop of Macra, in 1836 and 1842 diocesan administrator, and in 1842 archbishop. As archbishop, Vicari endeavoured to release the Church of Baden from the bonds of Josephinism and the principles of Wessenberg, and to defend its rights against the civil government. To overcome prevalent religious indifference he emphasized the rights of bishops in training and appointing the clergy, and enforced discipline as regards mixed marriages. In a violent dispute with the Government over his prohibition of a Requiem Mass for deceased Protestant rulers he was victorious, as also in later contests about the schools.

He was energetic in his support of the secular authority, and in the revolutionary years of 1848-1849 he exhorted the Catholics to remain loyal.

Though placed under police supervision and held prisoner in his palace, he brought about the reorganization of Catholic life in Baden. He founded a seminary for boys out of his private means, established a theological house of studies, and appointed men of religious conviction as professors at the ecclesiastical seminary. In numerous pastoral letters and exercises he animated the priests for their high calling, exhorted them to the fulfilment of their duties, and punished disobedience.

References

Sources
Kubel, Hermann von Vicari (Freiburg, 1869);
Hansjacob, Hermann von Vicari (Würzburg, 1873).

External links
Catholic Encyclopedia article

1773 births
1868 deaths
People from Aulendorf
Archbishops of Freiburg
Pope Pius IX
18th-century German Roman Catholic priests
Roman Catholic archbishops in the Grand Duchy of Baden